Othello Radou (1910–2006) was a French artist of the 20th century.

Biography

Childhood 
Born in Monte Carlo in 1910 to a musically talented family, his father was a French national and a successful violinist. When Othello Radou was 17, his father died after a long illness, and he had to move to Paris to find work. At the same time his childhood love of drawing led him to attend evening classes tutored by the artist Jean Lombard (1895–1983), who encouraged him to work  and exhibit with the group of artists known as Vert Bois. From 1943 onwards Othello Radou regularly exhibited at the Salon d'Automne, and the Salon des Indépendants in Paris.

From 1940's 
During World War II, Othello Radou was a member of the Resistance movements with his brother-in-law André Dreyer. Despite the difficulties of this period he persevered with his painting using any material he could find  - cardboard, paper, hardboard. From 1946, Othello Radou participated regularly in the group exhibition Salon des Réalités Nouvelles, showing his work with other artists such as Auguste Herbin, Jean Marie Euzet and Henri Valensi. The art critic of Le Soir, Leon Degand wrote of him in March 1947:  "With regard to painting, we hasten to draw attention to two revelations:  Willy Mucha and Othello Radou. The 'fauvist' expressionism of the first and the integral abstraction of the second, testify to serious qualities of invention. Their styles are not improvised and one discovers the complete presence of the artist. Two names that one likes the opportunity to find at private exhibitions". Othello Radou was also working at this time as a film producer and in 1946 he worked on the film, with  the Confédération Générale du Cinema Francais, entitled La Bataille du Rail directed by René Clément. This film won two prizes at the first Cannes Film Festival in 1946.

He continued working in film production until 1963, when he devoted himself entirely to his painting.

From 1960s 

During the 1960s, Othello Radou was commissioned by the French State to execute several murals for various scholastic establishments throughout France. In 1971, Galerie Camille Renault held Othello Radou's first one-man show in Paris. A review of the exhibition published in Carrefour by the art critic Frank Elgar describes the artist: '"quiet, solitary, preoccupied with his work. Radou has established his talent as an excellent talent in his mural paintings": these are the terms which Jean Cassou describes the painter of whose works Camille Renault is currently showing a selection. I would add that Radou is not only an excellent colourist, but also an excellent draughtsman, and he is not limited only to his activities as a mural painter.

Radou is a demanding artist, who invents geometric forms which are imprisoned in a network of straight lines, spirals, curves and contre-curves, and which give his large paintings, at the same time, a firm structure and very dynamic rhythm. In addition he paints with an exemplary honesty. In any mixture of colours there is no suspect impasto, no 'dripping', no violence. The materials used are always put on in thin and clear flat blocks on the canvas without special effects, without cheating. These recent canvases emphasise with more intensity the colours and are more subtle in composition.

When he is compelled to paint on a lesser scale he employs another technique. The architectural style is not suitable, so the execution is made in a freer manner, more instantaneous, more accommodating. In this way, Radou shows the extent of his resources. Sincerity, probity, sanity, these are the eminent qualities of his art, whose boldness does not contain a desire towards excess and to harshness, nor to ever go out of control through negligence or disorder."

Radou continued to exhibit in France, Germany, Lebanon, and Canada. By the end of his career the French State had purchased three paintings for the Musee National d'Art Moderne: one from the 1950s, one from the 1960s and one in 1983. In 1993, Radou's wife died and he ceased painting. He died in Paris in 2006.

Exhibitions 

1943 Member of Groupe du Vert-Bois
(directed by Jean Lombard);
Salon d'Automne

1945 Salon d'Automne;
Salon des Indépendants

1946 Salon d'Automne;
Salon des Indépendants;
1st Salon des Réalités Nouvelles
(co-founder);
2nd Salon de Mai

1947 Salon des Indépendants
(commended by Léon Degand);
Salon des Réalités Nouvelles
Exhibition at Galerie Denise René

1948 Salon des Réalités Nouvelles;
1st article: Benezit 'Dictionnaire
des peintres, sculpteurs, dessinateurs et graveurs'

1949 Salon des Réalités Nouvelles;
Salon de Mai
Article: Thieme Becker, completed by Vollmer
'Dictionnaire général des
artistes peintres, sculpteurs,
graveurs et architectes depuis
l'Antiquité jusqu'à nos jours'

1951 Salon des Réalités Nouvelles;
Salon de Mai;
Exhibition 'Tendances de la
jeune peinture française' in Germany
Canvas bought by the French State and hung at the Musée
National d'Art Moderne

1952/55 Salon des Réalités Nouvelles

1957 Article by Michel Seuphor,
Editions Hazan: 'Dictionnaire
de la peinture abstraite'
Participated in an international
exhibition connected to that
publication (Galerie Raymond
Greuze): one work by each
artist featured in the Dictionnaire
Seuphor

1961 Exhibition of Groupe du Vert-
Bois

1963 Salon des Réalités Nouvelles;
Group Exhibition 'Esquisse d'un
Salon' - Galerie Denise René
Purchase of canvas by French
state and hung in the Musée
National d'Art Moderne

1965 Purchase of canvas by the Ville
de Paris

1966 Commissioned by the State: A
Mural for a scholastic
establishment

1969 Commissioned by the State:
Mural for a scholastic
establishment
Commissioned by the State:
Mural for the University of
Grenoble

1970 Commissioned by the Ville de
Palaiseau: Mural for a scholastic
establishment

1971 One Man Show: Galerie
Camille Renault

1973 Commissioned by the State:
Mural for a scholastic
establishment

1974 4th Salon des Peintres du
Spectacle – Maison de l'ORTF

1975 Exhibition '23 peintres français'
Beirut, Lebanon;
Exhibition 'Mai à la Défense'

1976 5th Salon des Peintres du
Spectacle – Maison de l'ORTF

1977 Exhibition 'XIIème Grand Prix
International de l'Art
Contemporain de Monte-Carlo'

1979 Exhibition 'Bilan de l'Art
Contemporain'
Exhibition 'Sensibilités Plastiques
d'Aujourd'hui' - Mairie de Paris

1980 'International Art Exposition'
Coliseum, New-York (USA);
53rd exhibition du Cercle
Municipal des Gobelins et des
Beaux Arts - Paris

1981 Médaille de vermeil du Grand
Salon du Bilan de l'Art
Contemporain – Centre des
congrès de Québec (Canada)

1982 55th exhibition at the Cercle
Municipal des Gobelins et des
Beaux Arts - Paris

1983 Purchase of third canvas by the
French State;
'Exposition 83' de la Maison
des Artistes de Paris;
Salon d'Automne;
56th exhibition at the Cercle
Municipal des Gobelins et des
Beaux Art - Paris

2008: 'Geometric Abstraction – A
Retrospective of Paintings 1944
– 1957' John Adams Fine Art,
London

2010: 'Themes and Melodies: The
achievement of la grandeur.
Paintings 1960–1980' John
Adams Fine Art, London

2012: 'Harmonies: A selection of
works on paper' John Adams
Fine Art, London

Works 

His agent, John Adams in London explained his creative process :

"The evolution of a painting would require Radou to create a great many preparatory sketches encompassing both form and colour. This creative process would involve painstaking and meticulous sequential drawings, watercolours and pastels in order to formulate a finished harmony which would then be fully realised when ultimately transferred to canvas."

References 

1910 births
2006 deaths
People from Monte Carlo
Cubist artists
20th-century French painters
20th-century French male artists
French male painters
21st-century French painters
21st-century French male artists
French muralists
School of Paris